Milesia conspicienda is a species of hoverfly in the family Syrphidae.

Distribution
Sulawesi, Philippines.

References

Insects described in 1859
Eristalinae
Diptera of Asia
Taxa named by Francis Walker (entomologist)